Yponomeuta malinellus, the apple ermine, is a moth of the family Yponomeutidae. It is native to Europe and Asia, and it has spread to North America.

The forewings are white and have 12 to 16 black dots, which are arranged in three irregular lines.
The moth flies from June to October.

The larvae feed on apple species. It can defoliate apple trees and negatively impact fruit production for several years following an outbreak.

Y. malinellus larvae initially burrow into Malus leaves, and produce a silken web in May and early June, within which they feed. The larvae, when fully grown, vary in length from 18 to 25 mm. The moth is found across England, whereas there are few reports of it in Scotland, Wales or Ireland. In Britain, the adult moth flies in July and August.

References

External links
waarneming.nl 
lepiforum.de
Lepidoptera of Belgium
Apple ermine at UKmoths

Yponomeutidae
Insect pests of ornamental plants
Moths described in 1838
Moths of Europe